Choi Hung is a station on the Hong Kong MTR  in Ngau Chi Wan. The station is named after the nearby Choi Hung Estate, a public housing estate.

History
Choi Hung station was opened when Modified Initial System opened on 1 October 1979.

Livery
The station's livery is navy blue with stripes of the colours of the rainbow, as Choi Hung in Cantonese means "rainbow".

Station layout
Although there are four platforms at the station, only platforms 1 and 4 are fully functional. There are three tracks that run through the station, with platforms 2 and 3 sharing the middle track that is located in the middle of the station. Platform 2 is the termination platform for back-to-depot trains, while Platform 3 is the boarding platform for out-of-depot trains towards .

The platform screen doors of the third track served as prototypes in 2001 when MTR started to test the feasibility of installing these doors in stations throughout its system.

Entrances/exits

A1: Clear Water Bay Road (westbound), bus stops
A2: Ping Shek Estate, minibus stop, Serene Oasis
A3: Infinity Eight, No.8 Clear Water Bay Road
B: Ngau Chi Wan Market, Ngau Chi Wan Civic Centre, St. Joseph's Home for the Aged
C1: Ngau Chi Wan Village, minibus to Hang Hau
C2: Ngau Chi Wan Village, bus and minibus to Sai Kung, Hammer Hill Road Swimming Pool 
C3: Choi Hung Estate, Choi Ping Reading Centre, Hong Kong Association for the Deaf 
C4: Choi Hung Estate, bus stops on Lung Cheung Road (westbound)

Public art
The Grace of Ballerinas, a collection of three bronze sculptures by the Chinese artist Yin Zhixin, has been installed on the station concourse since February 2009.

Gallery

References

MTR stations in Kowloon
Kwun Tong line
Ngau Chi Wan
Railway stations in Hong Kong opened in 1979